Secondfest is a music festival which takes place in the Second Life virtual world. Unlike other musical performances on the web which provide audio through individual web pages for listeners to enjoy by themselves, Secondfest offers an on-line community the ability to experience entertainment together, in a large virtual space.

The first Secondfest event was aired in June 2007 and was favorably received by the artists and Second Life users alike. The festival was conceived and produced by the company Rivers Run Red - the metaverse development agency based in London (directed by Justin Bovington) and Sara Linfoot (head of digital partnerships) and Sarah Ellison (head of events) at The Guardian and curated by Sav Remzi of Tirk Records. The event was sponsored by Intel, with an emphasis on the 'power within' This, the first on-line festival of its type, featured artists and arenas from the UK festival circuit. Secondfest was subsequently awarded the AOP (Association of Online Publishers) prize for the 'Innovation' category and The Guardian Achievement Award for 'Innovation in advertising'.

Day one
Artists that performed on day one included:
 Toby Tobias
 Glimmer Twins
 Greg Wilson
 Groove Armada's Tom Findlay

Day two
Day two, making use of four 'stages', included the following artists:
 Hot Chip
 The Cinematic Orchestra
 Gilles Peterson
 New Young Pony Club
 The Aliens
 Hexstatic
 Coldcut

Other
Other real world artists who performed include:
 Pet Shop Boys
 Hadouken!
 Florence and the Machine
 Rob da Bank

In-universe bands also played:
 Strangefates
 DJ Jenns
 DJ Doubledown Tandino
 Slim Warrior

Also billed to 'appear' were:
 Simian Mobile Disco
 Digitalism
 The Knife

As well as the four stages, the festival site included a cinema, private beach party, games, roller skating, food court, bar, deer rides and walk on map.

See also
List of electronic music festivals
Live electronic music

References

External links 
 secondfest photos on Flickr

Music festivals established in 2007
Second Life
Music festivals staged internationally
Electronic music festivals in the United Kingdom